The men's 500 metres in speed skating at the 1988 Winter Olympics took place on 14 February, at the Olympic Oval.

Records
Prior to this competition, the existing world and Olympic records were as follows:

The following new world and olympic records was set.

Results

References

Men's speed skating at the 1988 Winter Olympics